The 2022–23 North Region Junior Football League is the 21st season of the North Region Junior Football League for SJFA North Region member clubs, and the 2nd season with its top division as part of the sixth tier of the Scottish football pyramid system. The league reverted back to a two-tier setup, featuring a 14-team Premier League and 16-team Championship.

Banks O' Dee are the reigning champions but are unable to defend their title after gaining promotion to the Highland League.

The Premier Division winners will enter the 2023–24 Scottish Cup at the preliminary round stage.

Teams

From North Region
Promoted to Highland Football League
Banks O' Dee
In Abeyance
Hall Russell United
Whitehills

To North Region
Banks O' Dee Junior
Lossiemouth United

Premier League

Maud were spared relegation after Banks O' Dee's promotion and Dufftown were also promoted after Hall Russell United went into abeyance before the season began.

Stadia and locations

League table

Results

Championship
The First and Second Divisions were merged to form the Championship.

League table

Results

References

External links

SJFA North Region Superleague seasons
6
Sco
Sco6